Sven Gustaf Hedin (6 October 1859 – 11 July 1933) was a Swedish chemist and physiologist credited with the discovery of histidine.

He was born in Alseda parish, Jönköping County. He began his studies in 1878 and received his bachelor's degree in 1881 at Uppsala University. In 1886 he received his doctorate in philosophy and doctorate of medicine in 1893 in Lund and docent in chemistry in 1886 and became a researcher there in 1895. From 1900 to 1907 he was made head of the pathological chemistry division at the Lister Institute of Preventive Medicine in London, and professor of medicinal and physiological chemistry at Uppsala University in 1908. Hedin was a member of the Royal Physiographic Society in Lund (1896) and the Royal Swedish Academy of Sciences (1902). Hedin was awarded the Björkénska priset in 1912.

He was the father-in-law of professor Harald Riesenfeld and uncle of literary historian . Hedin died in Uppsala and is buried in Uppsala Old Cemetery.

References 

1859 births
1933 deaths
Swedish chemists

Burials at Uppsala old cemetery